Amphicalvolia is a genus of mites in the family Acaridae.

Species
 Amphicalvolia hurdi Türk, 1963

References

Acaridae